The Zenit-3F, Zenit-3SLBF or Zenit-2SB/Fregat is an expendable carrier rocket. It is a member of the Zenit family of rockets, which were designed by Yuzhnoye Design Bureau of Ukraine.

Launches of Zenit-3SLBF rockets are conducted from Baikonur Cosmodrome Site 45/1. The rocket consists of a Zenit-2SB (Zenit-2M) core vehicle, with a Fregat-SB upper stage, developed by NPO Lavochkin of Russia, in place of the Block-DM used on the Zenit-3SL and 3SLB.

The first launch of a Zenit-3F took place on 20 January 2011. The payload was an Elektro-L new generation weather satellite. A Zenit-3F was also used to successfully launch the Spektr-R radio astronomy satellite on 18 July 2011.

Launches

References

Zenit (rocket family)
Vehicles introduced in 2011